Armillaria sinapina is a species of mushroom in the family Physalacriaceae. A plant pathogenic fungus, it causes  Armillaria root disease, and has been found on a variety of tree hosts in Alaska. The mycelium of the fungus is bioluminescent.

See also
List of Armillaria species
List of bioluminescent fungi

References

sinapina
Bioluminescent fungi
Fungal plant pathogens and diseases
Fungi described in 1988
Fungi of North America